The 2022–23 season is FC Shakhtar Donetsk's 32nd season in existence and the club's 24th consecutive season in the top flight of Ukrainian football. In addition to the domestic league, Shakhtar Donetsk will participate in the UEFA Champions League. The season covered the period from 1 July 2022 to 30 June 2023.

Season events
Due to the ongoing situation resulting from the Russian invasion of Ukraine, Roberto De Zerbi left his role as Head Coach of Shakhtar in July. On 14 July 2022, Igor Jovićević was announced as the clubs new head coach.

On 20 July, Shakhtar announced the signing of Neven Đurasek to a two-year contract from Dinamo Zagreb. The following day, Andriy Totovytskyi returned to Shakhtar on a three-year contract from Kolos Kovalivka.

At the end of July, the Ukrainian Association of Football announced that all clubs would relocate to western areas of Ukraine. for the upcoming season, with Shakhtar continuining to use the NSC Olimpiyskiy.

On 5 August, Shakhtar announced the return of Oleksandr Zubkov to the club on a five-year contract from Ferencváros.

On 22 August, Shakhtar announced the season-long loan signing of Lucas Taylor from PAOK, and the signing of Ivan Petryak to a four-year contract from Fehérvár.

On 1 September, Shakhtar announced the signing of Marian Shved to a five-year contract, from KV Mechelen.

On 23 September, Shakhtar announced the signing of Yehor Nazaryna to a five-year contract, from Zorya Luhansk.

On 29 November, Shakhtar announced the signing of Giorgi Gocholeishvili to a five-year contract, effective from 1 January, from Saburtalo Tbilisi.

On 15 January, Shakhtar announced that Mykhailo Mudryk had left the club to sign for Chelsea with Shakhtar receiving €70 million upfront and potentially another €30 million based on bonuses. The next day, 16 January, Shakhtar announced the return of Yaroslav Rakitskyi to the club on a contract until the end of the season.

On 31 January, Shakhtar announced the signing of Kevin Kelsy from Boston River on a contract until December 2027, whilst Serhiy Kryvtsov left the club to join Inter Miami.

On 10 February, Shakhtar announced the signing of Dmytro Riznyk from Vorskla Poltava to a five-year contract.

On 1 March, Shakhtar announced the signing of Khusrav Toirov from Atyrau on a five-year contract.

On 12 March, Shakhtar terminated their sponsorship deal with Parimatch after the sports betting company was sanctioned by National Security and Defense Council of Ukraine.

Squad

Contract suspensions

On loan

Transfers

In

Loans in

Out

Loans out

Contract suspensions

Friendlies

Competitions

Overall record

Premier League

League table

Results summary

Results by round

Results

UEFA Champions League

Group stage

UEFA Europa League

Knockout phase

Knockout round play-offs
The draw for the knockout round play-offs took place on 7 November 2022, with Shakhtar drawing Rennes.

Round of 16
The draw for the knockout Round of 16 took place on 24 February.

Squad statistics

Appearances and goals

|-
|colspan="14"|Players who suspended their contracts:
|-
|colspan="16"|Players away on loan:
|-
|colspan="16"|Players who left Shakhtar Donetsk during the season:

|}

Goalscorers

Clean sheets

Disciplinary record

Notes

References

External links 
Official website

Shakhtar Donetsk
FC Shakhtar Donetsk seasons
Shakhtar Donetsk